Nitrogen pentafluoride (NF5) is a theoretical compound of nitrogen and fluorine that is hypothesized to exist based on the existence of the pentafluorides of the atoms below nitrogen in the periodic table, such as phosphorus pentafluoride. Theoretical models of the nitrogen pentafluoride molecule are either a trigonal bipyramidal covalently bound molecule with symmetry group D3h, or NFF−, which would be an ionic solid.

Ionic solid
A variety of other tetrafluoroammonium salts are known (NFX−), as are fluoride salts of other ammonium cations ).

In 1966, W. E. Tolberg first synthesized a five-valent nitrogen compound of nitrogen and fluorine when tetrafluoroammonium compounds, tetrafluoroammonium hexafluoroantimonate NF4SbF6 and tetrafluoroammonium hexafluoroarsenate NF4AsF6 were made. In 1971 C. T. Goetschel announced the preparation of NF4BF4 and also produced a white solid assumed to be tetrafluoroammonium fluoride (NFF−). This was made by treating nitrogen trifluoride and fluorine with 3 MeV electron radiation at 77 K. It decomposed above 143 K back into those ingredients. Theoretical studies also show the ionic compound is very likely to decompose to nitrogen trifluoride and fluorine gas.

Karl O. Christe synthesised bis(tetrafluoroammonium) hexafluoronickelate (NF4)2NiF6. He also prepared compounds with manganese, a fluorouranate, a perchlorate, a fluorosulfate and N2F salts. Christe attempted to make NF4F by metathesis of NF4SbF6 with CsF in HF solvent at 20 °C. However, a variant, tetrafluoroammonium bifluoride (NF4HF2·nHF), was produced. At room temperature it was a milky liquid, but when cooled, turned pasty. At −45 °C it had the form of a white solid. When reheated it frothed, giving off F2, HF and NF3 as gases. This has CAS number 71485-49-9.

I. J. Solomon believed that nitrogen pentafluoride was produced by the thermal decomposition of NF4AsF6, but experimental results were not reproduced.

Dominik Kurzydłowski and Patryk Zaleski-Ejgierd predict that a mixture of fluorine and nitrogen trifluoride under pressure between 10 and 33 GPa forms NFF− with space group R3m. This is a high-pressure oxidation. Over 33 GPa it will form a stable ionic compound with formula (NF)2NFF– with space group I4/m. Over 151 GPa this is predicted to transform to NFNF with space group P4/n. A NF5 molecular compound is not stable under any pressure conditions.

Covalent molecule

For a NF5 molecule to form, five fluorine atoms have to be arranged around a nitrogen atom. There is insufficient space to do this in the most compact way, so that bond lengths are forced to be longer. Calculations show that the NF5 molecule is thermodynamically favourably inclined to form NF4 and F radicals with energy 36 kJ/mol and a transition barrier around 67–84 kJ/mol. Nitrogen pentafluoride also violates the octet rule in which compounds with eight outer shell electrons are particularly stable.

References

Nitrogen fluorides
Hypothetical chemical compounds
Nitrogen(V) compounds